The list of shipwrecks in October 1883 includes ships sunk, foundered, grounded, or otherwise lost during October 1883.

1 October

2 October

3 October

4 October

5 October

6 October

7 October

8 October

9 October

10 October

12 October

13 October

14 October

15 October

16 October

17 October

18 October

20 October

23 October

24 October

25 October

28 October

29 October

30 October

31 October

Unknown date

References

1883-10
Maritime incidents in October 1883